William Rufus Finch (December 14, 1847 – August 9, 1913) was a United States diplomat.

Biography
William R. Finch was born to John Reynolds and Lydia Ann Finch (née Rogers) in Walworth County, Wisconsin on December 14, 1847. On November 2, 1897, he married Lillie Martinette Law, and they had two children.

He died in La Crosse, Wisconsin on August 9, 1913.

Career
Finch served as U.S. Minister to Paraguay and Uruguay from 1898 to 1905. While in office, he gained permission from Paraguay to use their offices during the American occupation of Cuba.

See also
United States Ambassador to Paraguay
United States Ambassador to Uruguay

References

People from Walworth County, Wisconsin
Ambassadors of the United States to Paraguay
Ambassadors of the United States to Uruguay
1847 births
1913 deaths